Old Javanese or Kawi is the oldest attested phase of the Javanese language. It was spoken in the eastern part of what is now Central Java and the whole of East Java, Indonesia. As a literary language, Kawi was used across Java and on the islands of Madura, Bali and Lombok. It had a sizable vocabulary of Sanskrit loanwords but had not yet developed the formal krama language register, to be used with one's social superiors that is characteristic of modern Javanese.

History
While evidence of writing in Java dates to the Sanskrit Tarumanegara inscription of 450, the oldest example written entirely in Javanese, called the Sukabumi inscription, is dated 25 March 804. This inscription, located in the district of Pare in the Kediri Regency of East Java, is actually a copy of the original, dated some 120 years earlier; only this copy has been preserved. Its contents concern the construction of a dam for an irrigation canal near the river Śrī Hariñjing (now shortened to Srinjing). This inscription is the last of its kind to be written using Pallava script; all consequent examples of Old Javanese are written using Kawi script.

Development 
Old Javanese was not static, and its usage covered a period of approximately 500 years – from the Sukabumi (Kediri, East Java) inscription until the founding of the Majapahit empire in 1292. The Javanese language which was spoken and written in the Majapahit era already underwent some changes and is therefore already closer to the Modern Javanese language.

Austronesian origins 
The most important shaping force on Old Javanese was its Austronesian heritage in vocabulary, sentence structure and grammar that it shared with its sister languages in Southeast-Asia.

Sanskrit influence 
The Indian linguistic influence in Old Javanese language was almost exclusively Sanskrit influence. There is no evidence of Indian linguistic elements in Old Javanese other than Sanskrit. This is different from, for example, the influence of Indian linguistic in the (Old) Malay language.

Sanskrit has had a deep and lasting impact on the vocabulary of the Javanese language. The Old Javanese – English Dictionary, written by professor P.J. Zoetmulder in 1982, contains approximately 25,500 entries, no fewer than 12,500 of which are borrowed from Sanskrit. Clearly this large number is not an indication of usage, but it is an indication that the Ancient Javanese knew and employed these Sanskrit words in their literary works. In any given Old Javanese literary work, approximately 25% of the vocabulary is derived from Sanskrit.

Phonology 
Sanskrit has also influenced both the phonology and the vocabulary of Old Javanese. Old Javanese also contains the retroflex consonants, which might have been derived from Sanskrit. That is disputed by several linguists, who hold the view that it is also possible that the occurrence of these retroflex consonants was an independent development within the Austronesian language family.

Vocabulary 
A related question is the form in which Sanskrit words were loaned in Old Javanese. The borrowed Sanskrit words in Old Javanese are almost without exceptions nouns and adjectives in their undeclined form (Sanskrit lingga). Old Javanese texts contain many more characters with similar phonology value to represent distinct vowels and consonants in Sanskrit in such as unadapted loanwords. Wherever these diacritics occur in Old Javanese texts, they are neglected in pronunciation: bhaṭāra is the same as baṭara (loss of vowel length and aspiration is also shared by Elu Prakrit, the ancestor of Sinhala). Nor do they influence the order of the words in the dictionary: the variants s, ṣ and ś, for example, are all treated like s.

Influences 
Medieval poems written in Old Javanese using the Kawi script continued to be circulated within the courts of Kartasura, Surakarta, and Yogyakarta. The poems were called layang kawi (Kawi books) or kakawin and were held in high regard. Starting in the 18th century, literature inspired by Old Javanese were written using the modern Javanese language and verse.

Phonology

Vowels 
Old Javanese has six vowels. Those vowels are "a", "ĕ" /ə/, "e" /e/, i, u, and o in Latin transliteration. Little can be said about the pronunciation of Old Javanese. It is believed that
it has not been much different from the pronunciation of modern Javanese. Although, Old Javanese made distinction between those "short vowels" and "long vowels" in writing such as ā, ö, e, ī, ū, and o, however these "long vowels" have no distinction in phonology with those "short vowels". This distinction is generally happened with unadapted loanword from Sanskrit which differentiates the short and long vowels.

Consonants 
There are twenty consonants in Old Javanese which written as b, c, d, ḍ, g, h, j, k, l, m, n, ñ, ŋ, p, r, s, t, ṭ, w and y in Latin transliteration. The consonant ñ sometimes is written as digraph ny and IPA ɲ, while consonant ŋ sometimes is written as digraph ng.

Sandhi 
Sandhi is a cover term for a wide variety of sound changes that occur at morpheme or word boundaries.

 If a word ends in a vowel and the next word in the same sentence begins with a vowel, both words may merge into one, with one vowel instead of two vowels, such as dewatādi instead of dewata + adi.
 Merger of ĕ with preceding vowel results in assimilated ĕ to the preceding vowel, such as wawan (load, cargo; vessel, carrier, container, setting) from wawa (to carry, to bring) + ĕn.
 Similar vowels without short-long vowels consideration are assimilated as "long vowel". For example, rĕngön (hearing) is constructed from rĕngö (hearing, listening) + ĕn.
 The open vowel /a/ followed by close-front vowels of /e/ or /i/ are assimilated as /e/, such as bhinna ika become bhinneka (those are different). Meanwhile, the open vowel /a/ followed by close-back vowels of /o/ or /u/ is assimilated as /o/, such as mantra oṣadha become mantroṣadha.
 The semi-vowel y or w will replace the corresponding vowel i, u or ö, when followed by a dissimilar vowel. For example, kadi amṛta become kadyamṛta (i + a → ya), ri ubhaya become ryubhaya (i + u → yu), milu āśā become milwāśā (u + a → wa), māsku ibu become māskwibu (u + i → wi), and angangsö agawe become angangswagawe (ö + a → wa).

Grammar

Verb 
Old Javanese verbs are morphologically complex and are conjugated by taking on a variety of affixes reflecting focus/trigger, aspect, voice, and other categories.

Voice/Focus/Trigger 
 The active voice are derived through either prefix (m)aN- or infix -um-. 
 The prefix (m)aN-, which are realised as maN- and aN-, is the prefix to make transitive verbs, for example amati (to kill) from pati (death) and mangan (to eat) from pangan (food), if the base word is a verb. However, if the base word is a noun, the derivation can result in both transitive and intransitive verbs, such as angjanma (to be born, incarnate) from janma (man), whether the result will be either transitive or intransitive can not be predicted. In the base word is an adjective, the derived verbs are causative, such as anghilang (to cause something disappear) from hilang (disappeared). The derivation can undergo denasalization in particular situation such as pamangan instead of mamangan (to eat) and panginum instead of manginum (to drink).
 The infix -um- is the prefix to show active verb which generally show no different in meaning with the derivation with prefix (m)aN-. Sometimes, there is difference of meaning between the prefixed (m)aN- and infixed -um-, such as anahur (to repay) and sumahur (to answer) from sahur (answer, return).
 Passive voice are derived through either prefix ka- or infix -in-. It is not necessary to express the actor in passive sentence. If the actor explicitly mentioned, the actor is introduced by de and put after subject, such as "Katon pwa ta de sang Śrutasena".
 The prefix ka- refer to passive voice. If it is put before consonant of the stem, it shows no change. However, if it is put before vowels, the sandhi is applicable, such as in kālap (taken) from ka- + alap. Other than ā from a + a, the other sandhi are ā from a +  ĕ /ə/, e from a + either i or e, and o from a + u (there is no example with a + o exist).
 The other passive voice derivation is through infix -in-, such as inalap (taken) from alap.

Case 
The beneficiary-orientedness or of plurality can be indicated with suffix -i and -an. Suffix -i used for active transitive verbs (with prefix (m)aN- or infix -um-) which harmonised into either -i (amatī, to slay, from pati) and -ani (amatyani, to slay, from pati) after a vowel. However, passive transitive verbs use suffix -an (with prefix ka- or infix -in-). In case of a final vowel -a, -an is attached, not -anan, for example kapaḍan.
 Causative can be indicated by suffix -akĕn from verbal and nominal bases (either prefix (m)aN- or infix -um-). The verb with -akĕn is object-oriented. There is no combination between passive ka- with suffix -akĕn. 
 Applicative can be indicated by prefix maka- dan pinaka- with sandhi rules apply. Prefix maka- is used for active voice (with (m)aN- and -um- integrated), while passive voice use prefix pinaka- (with -in- and ka- integrated). The denasalisation phenomenon can be happened.

Mood 
 Irrealis mood can be indicated by suffix -a to the verbs. The active irrealis verb can be constructed active affixes (prefix (m)aN- or infix -um-) with suffix -a (such as manghuripa from manghurip). However, passive irrealis can be constructed with suppression of infix -in- and addition of suffix -ĕn (such as huripĕn), while addition of suffix -a to prefixed ka- passive verbs. Presence of sandhi sometimes made it is impossible to see whether -a of irrealis mood. In case of pronominal suffix presence, irrealis suffix prioritized.
 There are three ways to put a verb in the imperative mood.
 ...by bare form without any affix, such as mijil (please come out) and anunggangi (please mount), which is the polite form. This form just recognized by the context.
 ...drop of the verbal prefix, such as wijil and tunggangi.
 ...place either t(a) or p(a) before the unchanged or reduced form, such as ta mijil, ta wijil, pamijil or pawijil and tānunggangi, ta tunggangi, pānunggangi or patunggangi.
 Prohibition is expressed by the word haywa (do not), such as "haywa ta kita malara!" (Don't be sad!).

Noun and pronoun

Particle 
There are various particle in Old Javanese. Particle ta is the most common one. The other particles which occur regularly are pwa, ya and sira. These ya and sira as particle must be differentiated from the personal pronouns ya and sira, ‘he, she’. Sometimes they are combined such as ta pwa and ta ya. It is not compulsory to use them; they are often left out.

Personal pronouns and pronominal suffixes 
Old Javanese have several personal pronouns for the first, second, and third person each. The pronoun is not differentiated by singular and plural and social status in general. Sira may be used as honorific particle, similar to sang.

The personal pronoun have corresponding pronominal suffixes which serve to express either the possessive relationship or an agent.

The suffixes exhibit sandhi features, such as

 The suffix -ku have no change after consonant, such as in tanganku (my hand). However, the suffix will change into -ngku after a vowel.
 The suffix -ta have no change after consonant, but will change into -nta after vowel.
 The suffix -nya will change into -ya after n.
 The suffix -nira will change into -ira after n.

The third person pronominal suffixes can express a possessive relationship between two words, such as in "Wĕtunira sang Suyodhana" (the birth of Suyodhana). 

The third person pronominal suffixes can be used to nominalise verbs and adjectives such as widagdhanya (his skills) from adjective widagdha and pinintanira (his being asked) from verb pininta.

In Old Javanese a large number of other words than personal pronouns are used by way of personal pronoun for the first and second person.  They consist of fixed expressions in which the original meaning of the words involved does not play a role, and a virtually boundless list of words referring to functions and family relations. Proper names do not play a role in this respect. For example, first person pronoun can be manifested as nghulun (hulun, slave) and ngwang (wwang, man).

Demonstrative pronouns 
Old Javanese has four sets of demonstrative pronouns. The members of each set represent different degrees of distance seen from the speaker, while the four sets at least in theory express different shades of stress.

Determiner 
Old Javanese does not have an indefinite article. A noun without an article is indefinite. Old Javanese has three sorts of articles to express definiteness: a definite article, a number of honorific articles, and ika (there are still other ways of expressing definiteness in Old Javanese, for example the possessive suffix). Both definite article and honorific articles are placed before the noun and cannot stand by themselves. The definite article is (a)ng and it is written combined with particles. Examples of honorific articles which express a certain amount of respect are si, pun, sang, sang hyang, ḍang hyang, śrī and ra.    

Beside the definite article and the articles of respect, ika can be used to express definiteness. The word ika has two functions, those are definite article and demonstrative pronoun. The word ika as demonstrative pronoun means 'that' which is used to differentiated from 'this'. If there is no such contrast, its function is that of a definite article, meaning ‘the’. Ika is put in front of the word to which it belongs and always combined with the definite article.

Possessive suffixes 
Expression of possessiveness in Old Javanese is done with the help of possessive suffixes, such as suffix -(n)ing and -(n)ika. The suffix -ning is constructed from clitic -(n)i and definite article (a)ng. The clitic -(n)i has no meaning and cannot self-standing, although it is required in the construction. It is generally written as -ning, while it is written as -ing after base word ending in n. The suffix -(n)ika is constructed from clitic -(n)i and definite article ika and is written as -nika generally, while it is written as -ika after base word ending in n. The possessiveness can be expressed with pronominal suffixes, which no definite article is added in a such case. Honorific articles can be also express possessiveness and definiteness, such as ujar sang guru (the word of the teacher), by placing honorific article after the possessed noun and followed by possessor.

Adjective 
Old Javanese have two type of adjectives. The first one is adjective-class base word, such as urip (alive). The second one is adjective-class derived word which use affixation with prefix (m)a- from noun base words, such as adoh (far away) from doh (distance), ahayu (beautiful) from hayu (beauty) and mastrī (married) from strī (wife). In case of derivation with prefix (m)a-, the sandhi law is observed especially when the base word started with a vowel, such as mānak (having child) from anak (child), enak (at ease) from inak (ease), and mojar (having speech) from ujar (speech), while there is no change if the word begin with consonant. Nouns can be qualified by adjectives.

Adverb 
Verbs and adjectives, and also adverbs, can be qualified by adverbs. Adverbs are placed before of the words they qualify, except dahat (very, very much) is placed after the word. The word tan is used to express 'not' and have several forms as tatan, tātan, ndatan, and ndātan.

Preposition 
There are several preposition in Old Javanese, which the noun preceded by the preposition is definite, such as:

 Preposition (r)i has meaning of ‘in’, ‘on’, ‘at’, and ‘to’, but also ‘for’, ‘towards’, and even ‘by’, ‘through’.
 Preposition sa(ng)ka has meaning of ‘from’, ‘compared to’ (‘than’ in comparisons), ‘because of’.
 Combination of both preposition

However, there are particularities in expression of 'inside' or 'from inside' in Old Javanese. Old Javanese use combination of either jĕro or dalĕm (inner part, depth) followed by clitic -ni, such as dalĕmnikang to express idea of 'inside' or 'from inside'. Preposition of inside is expressed by placing either (r)i or sake before either jĕro or dalĕm (inner part, depth) without placement of both clitic -ni and definite articles.

It is important to remember that (r)i can be used for object marker of transitive verb and proper noun maker.

Conjunction 
There are several conjunctions in Old Javanese; the most common ones are an, yan, apan, and yarapwan. The order of elements in sub-clauses headed by an is the same as in main clauses: the subject follows the predicate. However, different from main clauses, in sub-clauses headed by an no separating particle is used.

 Conjunction an can be interpreted as either 'that', 'so that, in order to' and 'while, as'. The use of an may cause the suppression of -um- and denasalization.
 Conjunction yan means 'that' or 'if, when'.
 Conjunction apan means 'because'.

Syntax
In a basic clause, predicate and subject are separated from each other by a particle (ta) marking the border between both parts of the sentence. For example, "lunghā ta sira" means "he leaves" as leave (lunghā), particle (ta), and the third person pronoun (sira). The predicate comes first in the sentence, the subject follows the predicate, which is the normal order. However, the reversed order also occurs which it signals of some particularity such as stress intended by the writer. These sentences lack an indication of time.

Subject in Old Javanese can be personal pronoun, noun, and proper names. The predicate can be a verbal predicate where the predicate is a verb. The predicate can also be a nominal predicate, where the predicate can be an adjective and nouns, including proper names, and pronouns. Old Javanese verbs are not conjugated and do not formally distinguish between present and past time.

Writing system

Old Javanese or Kawi was written with Kawi script in 8th–16th century. The Kawi or Old Javanese script is a Brahmic script found primarily in Java and used across much of Maritime Southeast Asia. The Kawi script is related to the Pallava script and Kadamba script in South India. 

Old Javanese or Kawi can be written with Balinese script and Javanese script in modern literatures.

Usage

Oral expression 
Kawi is not truly extinct as a spoken language. It is commonly used in some Javanese traditional events such as wayang golek, wayang wong and wayang kulit, in addition to high activities such as a Javanese wedding, especially for the stylised meeting ritual of bride's parents with groom's parents in the ceremonies of Peningsetan and Panggih. Archaically or for certain nobles very strongly attached to tradition, it is used for the Midodareni, Siraman and Sungkeman ceremonies of the Javanese wedding.

The island of Lombok has adopted Kawi as its regional language, reflecting the very strong influence of neighbouring East Java. Today, it is taught in primary school education as part of the compulsory secondary language unit of National curriculum. Traditionally, Kawi is written on lontar prepared palm leaves.

Literature 

Kawi remains in occasional use as an archaic prose and literary language, in a similar fashion to Shakespeare-era English, which has such aesthetically and arguably more cultivated words as thy, thee, hast and so forth.

There are many important literary works written in Kawi, most notably Empu Tantular's epic poem, "Kakawin Sutasoma" (E.M. Uhlenbeck, 1964: "A Critical Survey of Studies on the Languages of Java and Madura", The Hague: Martinus Nijhoff), from which is taken the National motto of Indonesia: "Bhinneka Tunggal Ika". Although often glibly translated as "Unity in Diversity", it is more correctly rendered as "[although] scattered, remaining [as] one"— referring to the scattered islands of the archipelago nation, not as an expression of multicultural solidarity as may be perceived in modern times.

A more modern work is the poem "Susila Budhi Dharma", by Muhammad Subuh Sumohadiwidjojo, the founder of Subud.  In this work, he provides a framework for understanding the experience of the latihan kejiwaan.

List of famous poems, epics and other literature 
Famous poems, epics and other literature include:
 Shivagrha inscription, 856
 Kakawin Ramayana ~ 870
 Kakawin Arjunawiwaha, mpu Kanwa, ~ 1030
 Kakawin Kresnayana
 Kakawin Sumanasantaka
 Kakawin Smaradhana
 Kakawin Bhomakawya
 Kakawin Bharatayuddha, mpu Sedah and mpu Panuluh, 1157
 Kakawin Hariwangsa
 Kakawin Gatotkacasraya
 Kakawin Wrettasañcaya
 Kakawin Wrettayana
 Kakawin Brahmandapurana
 Kakawin Kunjarakarna, mpu "Dusun"
 Kakawin Nagarakertagama, mpu Prapanca, 1365
 Kakawin Arjunawijaya, mpu Tantular
 Kakawin Sutasoma, mpu Tantular
 Kakawin Siwaratrikalpa, Kakawin Lubdhaka
 Kakawin Parthayajna
 Kakawin Nitisastra
 Kakawin Nirarthaprakreta
 Kakawin Dharmasunya
 Kakawin Harisraya
 Kakawin Banawa Sekar Tanakung

Prominent authors 
The following are notable authors of literary works in Kawi.
 Mpu Kanwa (11th century)
 Mpu Sedah (12th century)
 Mpu Panuluh (12th century)
 Mpu Dharmaja (12th century)
 Mpu Monaguna (12th century)
 Mpu Triguna (12th century)
 Mpu Tantular (14th century)
 Mpu Prapanca (14th century)
 Mpu Tanakung (15th century)

Inscription 
The earliest written records in an indigenous language found in Java are indeed in (Old) Javanese.

 Karangtengah inscription (824 CE)
 Tri Tepusan inscription (842 CE)
 Shivagrha inscription (856 CE)
 Mantyasih inscription (907 CE)
 Turyyan inscription (929)
 Anjuk Ladang inscription (935/937)
 Terep inscription (1032)
 Turun Hyang II inscription (1044)
 Kambang Putih inscription (1050)
 Banjaran inscription (1052)
 Malenga inscription (1052)
 Garaman inscription (1053)
 Sumengka inscription (1059)
 Hantang/Ngantang inscription (1135)
 Mula Malurung inscription (1255)
 Kudadu inscription (1294)
 Tuhañaru/Jayanagara II inscription (1323)
 Waringin Pitu inscription (1447)

Nevertheless, there are exceptions to this pattern of language distribution in the epigraphical record. There are several inscription using Old Javanese language on the island of Sumatra, by editing three short epigraphs.

 Inscription of Kapalo Bukit Gombak II
 Inscribed Makara from the Northen Gopura, Candi Kedaton, Muara Jambi Temple Complex
 Inscribed Golden Bowl of Rokan Hilir, Riau

Scholars
The first scholar to address Kawi in a serious academic manner was Wilhelm von Humboldt, who considered it the father of all Malay-Polynesian languages. Furthermore, he deprecated misconceptions about Kawi being wholly influenced by Sanskrit, finding that Kawi did not use verb inflexion, thus differing from Sanskrit's highly developed inflectional system. Kawi might have come from a very ancient settlement in the pacific side of Asia.  In Kawi language, the meaning of a sentence must be grasped through word order and context. Humboldt further noted that Kawi utilizes tense distinctions, with past, present, and future, and differentiated moods via the imperative and subjunctive.

Numerous scholars have studied the language, including the Dutch expatriate Indonesian Prof. Dr. Petrus Josephus Zoetmulder S.J., who contributed an enormous quantity of original texts and serious scholarly study to the language, and his pupil and associate, Father Dr. Ignatius Kuntara Wiryamartana. Other eminent Indonesian scholars of the language include Poedjawijatna, Sumarti Suprayitna, Poerbatjaraka and Tardjan Hadiwidjaja.

See also
Bhinneka Tunggal Ika
Johan Hendrik Caspar Kern
Eugenius Marius Uhlenbeck
Petrus Josephus Zoetmulder
Old Malay
Old Sundanese

References

Bibliography
 
 
 Wilhelm von Humboldt (1836). Über die Kawi-Sprache [On the Kawi Language] (in German): Vol 1, Vol 2, Vol 3
 
 
 
 
   
 
1992–1993, Bahasa parwa : tatabahasa Jawa Kuna: Yogyakarta: Gadjah Mada University Press. Bekerja sama dengan I.J. Poedjawijatna. Cetakan ulang dari edisi tahun 1954

External links
About lontar (palmleaf manuscripts).
Zoetmulder's Dictionary of Old Javanese (SEAlang Library)
Old Javanese inscriptions (SEAlang Library)
An Introduction to Old Javanese at Tokyo University of Foreign Studies (A pdf primer in English, though the web page is in Japanese)

Languages attested from the 9th century
Javanese language
Javanese culture
Extinct languages of Asia